Veronika Aigner (born 13 February 2003) is an Austrian visually impaired para alpine skier. She won a gold medal at the 2022 Winter Paralympics.

Career
Aigner competed at the 2022 Winter Paralympics and won a gold medal in the giant slalom and slalom events.

Personal life
Aigner's twin siblings, Barbara, and Johannes are both visually impaired para skiers.

References 

Living people
2003 births
Austrian female alpine skiers
Alpine skiers at the 2022 Winter Paralympics
Medalists at the 2022 Winter Paralympics
Paralympic gold medalists for Austria
Paralympic medalists in alpine skiing
Visually impaired category Paralympic competitors
Austrian blind people
21st-century Austrian women